Egeria densa, the large-flowered waterweed or Brazilian waterweed, is a species of Egeria native to warm temperate South America in southeastern Brazil, Argentina, Chile and Uruguay. It is considered a problematic invasive species due to its use in home aquariums and subsequent release into non-native ecosystems.

Description 

The stem system of the plant will grow until it reaches the surface of the water, where it will begin to spread out, creating a thick flower canopy that blocks light from reaching plants below it.

Life cycle 
Egeria densa typically displays little variation in growth patterns throughout the year when grown in tropical environments; however, when grown in more moderate environments the plant spends most of its energy on starch production and storage in the winter and canopy growth during the summer season

Habitat and ecology

Location 
Egeria densa is native to Argentina, Brazil, Amerika, Chile and Uruguay. As a result of its popularity in aquariums the plant has now spread to North America, Europe, Asia, Australia, New Zealand, and Africa.

Temperature 
Colder temperatures will limit growth of the plant and can be used as a method of controlling its spread in non-native ecosystems.

Lighting 
Egeria densa is able to match photosynthetic output to available light like many macrophyte species. The species' ability to thrive in low light conditions and its ability to form a dense canopy makes it a very successful invader compared with other macrophytes, resulting in a reduction in the diversity of plant species where it is introduced.

Cultivation and uses 
Egeria densa is a popular aquarium plant, but is no longer sold in some areas due to its invasive potential. Plants in cultivation are all a male clone, reproducing vegetatively.

It grows well in the cooler aquarium and is suitable for the beginner. It is easily propagated by cuttings. According to reports it secretes antibiotic substances which can help prevent blue-green algae. It grows best in a nutrient-rich, high light environment, but has shown an ability to outcompete other species when it is introduced.

Economics 

E. densa, like other macrophytes, are effective when used in wastewater treatment plants due to the same factors that make it a potential invasive plant; mainly its ability to uptake nutrients, and sedimentation of particles from the water column.

Invasive species 

Egeria densa has escaped from cultivation and become naturalized and invasive in many warm temperate to subtropical regions of the world, including Europe, southern Africa, Asia, Australia, New Zealand, New Caledonia and North America. In the United States it occurs from New York south to Florida and west to California and Oregon. In the Sacramento-San Joaquin Delta of California, it was introduced in the 1960s and has since had a significant adverse impact on the local ecosystem. The plant currently infests , or 12% of the total surface area of the delta, along with other states and even as far north as Canada. Recently, E. densa was reported as naturalized alien species in Iceland where it invaded the naturally heated water bodies. Due to its occurrence in northern Iceland, E. densa is one of the first freshwater alien plant species that reached the Arctic. Most of its impact occurs in the shallow waterways; the plant forms thick mats that obstruct boat passage, clog water intakes and aqueducts, trap sediments, crowd out native vegetation, and impede the migration of anadromous fish.

Role as ecosystem engineer 
Though it is sometimes debated, E. densa is referred to as an ecosystem engineer as a result of the impact it has on a environment once it is introduced. Some of these impacts are due to its fast growth and high dispersal rate when fragmented, its ability to adapt to different light and nutrient availability, its uptake of nutrients from the water column and its effect on sedimentation of these nutrients, and the large light-blocking canopy that its flowers form at the surface of the water.

Egeria densa is also responsible for changing the amount of phytoplankton present in the water column due to limiting light availability from the dense canopy that it forms, and from the amount of nutrients that removes from the water column. It can, however, also function as shelter for zooplankton and smaller invertebrates.

Black-necked swans feed on the plant, and decline of E. densa has been linked to the decline of swan populations.

Control 
A variety of methods are needed to ensure that growth of E. densa is stopped due to its ability to regrow when fragmented through mechanical means. The best way is to remove the plant in entirety from the water column or use herbicides to kill the plant. One of the potential solutions to the problem are water drawdowns, as the plant is very sensitive to drying out and the plant can die in as short as an hour when removed from water. In addition cold weather has been found to be effective in controlling the plant, though this has practical limitations. When herbicides were applied to the plant, the levels of phosphorus and nitrogen increased but not greatly, suggesting that most of the nutrients remained in the plant biomass and did not reabsorb into the water column.

References

External links

 Species Profile – Brazilian waterweed (Egeria densa) National Invasive Species Information Center, United States National Agricultural Library.

Hydrocharitaceae
Freshwater plants
Aquarium plants
Dioecious plants